Joseph Gaddy DeBerry (November 29, 1896 – October 9, 1944) was a Major League Baseball pitcher who played for the St. Louis Browns in  and .

DeBerry played college baseball for the North Carolina State College Wolfpack.

References

External links
Baseball Reference.com

1896 births
1944 deaths
St. Louis Browns players
Major League Baseball pitchers
Baseball players from North Carolina
NC State Wolfpack baseball players
People from Mount Gilead, North Carolina